Anatragus ornatus is a species of beetle in the family Cerambycidae. It was described by Hermann Julius Kolbe in 1897. It is known from Tanzania.

References

Endemic fauna of Tanzania
Tragocephalini
Beetles described in 1897
Taxa named by Hermann Julius Kolbe